Forficula abrutiana is a species of earwig in the family Forficulidae. They can be found in the Palearctic realm, especially in Italy.

References 

Forficulidae
Endemic fauna of Italy
Insects described in 1916